Teachers Pay Teachers is an online marketplace for buying and selling educator resources. It focuses on a PreK-12 audience. Founded in 2006, Teachers Pay Teachers has over 2.6 million active users with sales exceeding $60 million.

It was acquired by IXL Learning on March 2, 2023.

References

External links
 

Online marketplaces